Asa Hoxie Willie (October 11, 1829 – March 16, 1899) was a United States representative representing Texas and chief justice of the Texas Supreme Court. During the Civil War, he served as a major in the Confederate Army. Willie was elected as a Democrat to one term in Congress from 1873 to 1875 as an at-large member.

Early life
Willie was born the son of James and Caroline (Hoxie) Willie in Washington, Georgia, on October 11, 1829. Willie attended private schools in Wilkes County, Georgia and at the age of 16, he moved to Brenham, Texas in 1846 and studied law in the office of his older brother, James Willie.  He was admitted to the bar in 1848 and commenced practice in Brenham.  He was elected district attorney of the third judicial district of Texas from 1852-1854.

Civil War
In 1858, Willie moved to Marshall where he and Alex Pope formed a law partnership. He married Bettie Johnson of Brandon, Mississippi in 1859. With the outbreak of the Civil War, Willie was commissioned a major in the Seventh Texas Infantry of the Confederate Army on the staff of Colonel John Gregg. Willie was captured along with most of his troops at Fort Donelson in February 1862. The captured men were confined at Johnson's Island, Ohio for nine months before the regiment was exchanged in time to take part in the Battle of Chickamauga in September, 1863.  Willie fought the rest of the battles of the Army of Tennessee until its surrender.

Judge and Congressman
After the Civil War, Willie moved to Galveston, Texas and in 1866 was elected Associate Justice of the Texas Supreme Court but was removed by Reconstruction military authorities in 1867.  After his service on the court, Willie resumed the practice of law.  After Reconstruction was complete and Texans resumed their rights under the U.S. Constitution, Texas received two additional congressional representatives through apportionment as a result of the 1870 Census.  The legislature did not redraw the state's 4 congressional districts and instead allowed two members to be elected in at-large districts.  Willie was elected to Congress in 1872 and served for one term.  Willie did not seek reelection in 1874 and returned to Galveston where he was elected city attorney in 1875 and 1876. In 1882, Willie was appointed Chief Justice of the Texas Supreme Court by Governor Oran M. Roberts, himself a former Chief Justice of Texas.  Willie served on the court until his retirement in 1888.

Death and interment
Willie died in Galveston on March 16, 1899. Interment was at Trinity Episcopal Church Cemetery, Galveston.

References

Sources
 Retrieved on 2009-03-23
Handbook of Texas Online. Texas State Historical Association.
The Political Graveyard
Texas Civil War Regiments

1829 births
1899 deaths
People of Texas in the American Civil War
People from Galveston, Texas
Chief Justices of the Texas Supreme Court
Democratic Party members of the United States House of Representatives from Texas
19th-century American politicians
19th-century American judges